The 1908–09 season saw Palace fail to reach the heights of the previous season.  They had finished fourth in 1907-08, but this season would see them end up in 16th place. The squad underwent changes once again, with Matthew Edwards moving from Palace to Doncaster Rovers, Bill Forster moving to Grimsby Town, Billy Davies moving to West Bromwich Albion, Dick Roberts to Worcester City and Isaac Owens to Bath City.

Edward Collins came into the club from Carlisle United as a full back. James Thorpe, a half back, joined from Leeds City, while forward George Garratt joined from West Bromwich Albion. Adam Haywood joined as a player-coach, playing in a forward role, mainly as an inside right. Charles McGibbon, a centre forward, came from New Brompton and Bill Lawrence returned for a second spell at the club. Jimmy Bauchop not only finished the season top-scorer, he also started it off by becoming the first player to be sent off in a Palace shirt, on 9 September 1908 in a London Challenge Cup tie against Croydon Common.

Southern Football League First Division

FA Cup

Palace again entered the draw in the first round proper. They were drawn away to the winners of the previous season, Wolverhampton Wanderers. Bauchop, formerly of Celtic, secured a draw with two goals for Palace. In the replay, Wolves took the lead with barely a minute gone, before Palace equalised through Lawrence within 15 minutes. Bauchop then thought he had put Palace ahead, but was in an off-side position. Palace lost Ryan to an injury shortly before half-time and battled on with ten men, before Ryan re-entered the fray to help see them to the half-time whistle. Collins eventually put Palace ahead but they failed to hold onto the lead and a  resurgent Wolves equalised with 8 minutes to play. The tie went to extra time, and Bauchop scored a third with Needham, covering at full back, putting the tie beyond Wolves in the final minute. The goal was recalled nearly forty years later by a letter writer to the Croydon Advertiser: "Needham playing at left back tackled and robbed a Wolves forward - a clever piece of play. Instead of passing the ball up field, he simply weaved his way through all the players and dribbled it right up to the Wolves' goal, putting in an unstoppable shot." In the second round they drew Burnley, drawing at home and losing the replay 9–0 in. The defeat remains the club's heaviest loss in the FA Cup.

Squad statistics

Notes

References

Bibliography

 Matthews, Tony (editor). We All Follow The Palace. Juma, 1998. 

Citations

Crystal Palace F.C. seasons
Crystal Palace F.C.